Obnoxio the Clown is a character appearing in American comic books published by Marvel Comics. The character appears in the humor magazine Crazy and served as its mascot. He was created by Larry Hama.

Character
Obnoxio was portrayed as a slovenly, vulgar, cigar-puffing middle-aged man in a torn and dirty clown suit, with a dyspeptic and cynical attitude.

Background
Larry Hama created Obnoxio immediately after he became the editor of Crazy. He explained, "I thought the old mascot was too 'nebbishy.' I wanted someone proactive, and somebody who actually had a voice, unlike all the other humor magazine mascots." The character's face was modeled from Al Milgrom.

Artist Alan Kupperberg, who would become heavily associated with the character, recounted, "Obnoxio's first appearance was in a one-panel illustration to accompany a subscription ad in Crazy, written by Larry and calling for likenesses of P. T. Barnum and Marcy Tweed among others. This was right up my alley, so I pulled the reference and really went to town, doing a very nice half-tone illo. I think the piece impressed Larry quite a bit, because if my memory is correct, Larry left me strictly alone on anything and everything Obnoxio the Clown-related." Most of the Obnoxio features were written by Virgil Diamond, who according to Hama "was a high school English teacher in Brooklyn. I heard from him a few years ago when he retired. He really labored on those pages and was constantly fussing with them."

In other media

Comic books
Obnoxio the Clown appeared in a number of single-page gags in What If? #34 (August 1982).

Marvel also published a one-shot Obnoxio the Clown (titled Obnoxio the Clown vs. the X-Men on the cover) comic book in April 1983, despite the fact that Crazy had already been cancelled. The plot centered on Obnoxio the Clown as a villain and unlikely ally of the X-Men. He and the group, at the X-Mansion, 'team-up' against Eye Scream, a villain who can transform into various types of ice cream.

The sole issue of the comic book was written, illustrated, colored, and lettered by Alan Kupperberg; in a comment which Kupperberg attributed to Peter David, and which David attributes to James Owsley, the comic was described as "Written, penciled, inked and lettered by Alan Kupperberg. Yes, it’s untouched by human hands."

Long after Obnoxio had disappeared from the spotlight, Marvel published two last Obnoxio the Clown stories written and drawn by Kupperberg, eight page features in What The--?! #13 (July 1991) and #24 (December 1992).

Television
Obnoxio makes a cameo appearance in the Hulk and the Agents of S.M.A.S.H. episode "Fear Itself", voiced by John DiMaggio. The Agents of S.M.A.S.H. receive old television signals including a TV show starring Obnoxio which freaks A-Bomb out. He somewhat appears later in the episode as a part of an illusion caused by Null that releases people's fears where Null unleashes this illusion on A-Bomb.

Video games
Android replicas of Obnoxio the Clown appear as enemies during the Wolverine levels in Spider-Man and the X-Men in Arcade's Revenge. Though he is not seen in the game, Obnoxio the Clown is briefly mentioned in the Facebook game Marvel: Avengers Alliance. Obnoxio the Clown is mentioned to have been murdered by the Circle of Eight.

Novel
In the alternate reality depicted in the "Doctor Doom: The Chaos Trilogy" novels, written by Steven A. Roman, Obnoxio has a popular slapstick comedy show.

References

External links
 Obnoxio the Clown - General information (blog).
 Marvel Appendix entry on Eye Scream, villain from the one-shot.

Comics characters introduced in 1980
Characters created by Larry Hama
Marvel Comics supervillains
Fictional clowns
Magazine mascots
Male characters in comics
Male characters in advertising
Mascots introduced in 1980